Taru Jabba is a village of Nowshera district, Khyber Pakhtunkhwa, Pakistan. It is 11 km away from Peshawar City. It is famous for Chapli Kabab. Rambel Khan Chapli Kabab is very famous around the country.

References

Populated places in Nowshera District